Pfieffe may refer to:

Pfieffe, Spangenberg, a district of Spangenberg, a town in Hesse, Germany
Pfieffe (Fulda), a river of Hesse, Germany, tributary of the Fulda